KCYU-LD (channel 41) is a low-power television station in Yakima, Washington, United States, affiliated with Fox and Telemundo. The station is owned by Imagicomm Communications, and maintains studios on West Lincoln Avenue in Yakima; its transmitter is located on Ahtanum Ridge.

Although considered a separate station in its own right, KCYU-LD is a semi-satellite of Pendleton, Oregon–licensed KFFX-TV (channel 11), which serves the Tri-Cities area. KCYU-LD simulcasts all Fox network and syndicated programming as provided through its parent, and the two stations share a website. However, KCYU-LD airs separate legal identifications and commercial inserts. KFFX-TV serves the eastern half of the Tri-Cities/Yakima market while KCYU-LD serves the western portion. Master control and some internal operations of KCYU-LD are based at KFFX-TV's studios on Clearwater Avenue in Kennewick. On satellite, KCYU-LD is only available on Dish Network, while DirecTV carries KFFX-TV instead.

History
Fox programming first came to Yakima on October 1, 1989, when K53CY channel 53 (generally referred to as simply "KCY") signed on as a semi-satellite of Spokane's KAYU-TV; it aired most of KAYU's programming (with the exception of programming that KAYU did not hold the rights to show in Yakima), with inserts for local commercials. Prior to K53CY's sign-on, Fox programming was available on Yakima cable from KAYU; subsequently, KAYU was not carried in Ellensburg. A construction permit for a new low-power station on channel 68 in Yakima was issued on April 1, 1993 and given the call sign K68EB; this facility signed on a month later. Despite the different call sign, K68EB was still called "KCY" outside of Federal Communications Commission-required station identifications.

Original owner Salmon River Communications sold K68EB, along with KAYU-TV, KBWU-LP in the Tri-Cities, and KMVU in Medford, Oregon, to Northwest Broadcasting in 1995. The call letters were changed to KCYU-LP on November 20, 1995. KCYU-LP remained a semi-satellite of KAYU until January 1999, when it became a semi-satellite of the new KFFX-TV. The station remained on channel 68 until 2003, when KCYU-LP moved to channel 41. On December 15, 2008, KCYU-LP ended analog broadcasting and converted to a high definition digital signal; in reflection of this conversion, the call letters were modified to the current KCYU-LD on July 8, 2009.

In February 2019, Reuters reported that Apollo Global Management had agreed to acquire the entirety of Brian Brady's television portfolio, which it intends to merge with Cox Media Group (which Apollo is acquiring at the same time) and stations spun off from Nexstar Media Group's purchase of Tribune Broadcasting, once the purchases are approved by the FCC. In March 2019 filings with the FCC, Apollo confirmed that its newly-formed broadcasting group, Terrier Media, would acquire Northwest Broadcasting, with Brian Brady holding an unspecified minority interest in Terrier. In June 2019, it was announced that Terrier Media would instead operate as Cox Media Group, as Apollo had reached a deal to also acquire Cox's radio and advertising businesses. The transaction was completed on December 17.

On March 29, 2022, Cox Media Group announced it would sell KCYU-LD, KFFX-TV and 16 other stations to Imagicomm Communications, an affiliate of the parent company of the INSP cable channel, for $488 million; the sale was completed on August 1.

Programming
Outside of the Fox network schedule, syndicated programming on KCYU-LD includes 2 Broke Girls, Two and a Half Men, Judge Mathis and Modern Family, among others. KCYU also airs a nightly newscast, Fox First at Ten. The newscast is produced weeknights by NBC affiliate KNDU (channel 25); on weekends, the station carries the 10 p.m. newscast from Spokane sister station KAYU-TV (produced by KNDU's sister KHQ-TV (channel 6)). The station also carries KAYU's KHQ-produced Good Day on weekday mornings.

Technical information

Subchannels
The station's digital signal is multiplexed:

On April 21, 2009, KCYU-LD began airing This TV on its digital subcarrier. This TV is also carried on Charter Cable channel 292.

Translators
KCYU-LD is rebroadcast on a translator.

K26NF-D Channel 26 Ellensburg (owned by the Kittitas County TV Improvement District)

References

External links
 

Fox network affiliates
Telemundo network affiliates
Ion Television affiliates
CYU-LD
Low-power television stations in the United States
Television channels and stations established in 1993
1993 establishments in Washington (state)
Imagicomm Communications